This is a list of dedicated video game consoles in chronological order. Only officially licensed dedicated consoles are listed in the retro style sections. This list may not be complete yet.

Dedicated consoles are video game consoles that have a single game or a limited list of games built into the console itself, and are not equipped for additional games that are distributed via ROM cartridges, discs, downloads, or other media. All first-generation video game consoles are dedicated consoles. Starting in the 2000s, there has been a new wave of dedicated consoles focused primarily on retrogaming.

Early dedicated home consoles (1972–1984)

There are  home video game consoles known to have been released in the first generation of video game consoles. They can be found in the List of first generation home video game consoles.

Early handheld electronic games (1976–present)

Retro style dedicated home consoles and handhelds (2001–present) 

Retro styled dedicated video game consoles and handhelds are listed within the main article.

See also
List of best-selling game consoles
List of video game console emulators
List of video game consoles
List of retro style video game consoles
List of home video game consoles
List of handheld game consoles
List of microconsoles

References

 
Dedicated consoles